Plagiocirrus is a genus of trematodes in the family Opecoelidae.

Species
Plagiocirrus primus Van Cleave & Mueller, 1932
Plagiocirrus testeus Fritts, 1959
Plagiocirrus wuyiensis Wang, 1981

References

Opecoelidae
Plagiorchiida genera